The 2015 Brest Challenger was a professional tennis tournament played on hard courts. It was the first edition of the tournament which was part of the 2015 ATP Challenger Tour. It took place at the Brest Arena in Brest, France between 19 and 25 October 2015.

Points and prize money

Point distribution

Prize money

* per team

Singles main-draw entrants

Seeds

 1 Rankings are as of 12 October 2015.

Other entrants
The following players received wildcards into the singles main draw:
  Benoît Paire
  Grégoire Jacq
  Alexandre Sidorenko
  Romain Jouan

The following player received entry using a special exemption:
  Illya Marchenko

The following players received entry from the qualifying draw:
  Romain Barbosa
  Maxime Tabatruong
  Sadio Doumbia
  Yannik Reuter

Retirements
  Illya Marchenko (left foot, first round)
  Maxime Teixeira (left abductor, second round)

Doubles main-draw entrants

Seeds

1 Rankings are as of 12 October 2015.

Other entrants

The following pair received a wildcard into the doubles main draw:
  Romain Jouan /  Alexandre Penaud

Champions

Singles

  Ivan Dodig def.  Benoît Paire, 7–5, 6–1.

Doubles

  Wesley Koolhof /  Matwé Middelkoop def.  Ken Skupski /  Neal Skupski, 3–6, 6–4, [10–6].

References

 Official Results Archive (ATP)
 Official Results Archive (ITF)
 Singles Draw
 Doubles Draw
 Qualifying Singles Draw

Brest Challenger
Brest Challenger
2015 in French tennis